The Damned are an English punk rock band formed in London in 1976 by lead vocalist Dave Vanian, guitarist Brian James, bassist (and later guitarist) Captain Sensible, and drummer Rat Scabies. They were the first punk band from the United Kingdom to release a single, "New Rose" (1976), release a studio album, Damned Damned Damned (1977), and tour the United States. They have nine singles that charted on the UK Singles Chart Top 40.

The band briefly broke up after Music for Pleasure (1977), the follow-up to their debut studio album, was critically dismissed. They quickly reformed without Brian James, and released Machine Gun Etiquette (1979). In the 1980s they released four studio albums, The Black Album (1980), Strawberries (1982), Phantasmagoria (1985), and Anything (1986), which saw the band moving towards a gothic rock style. The latter two albums did not feature Captain Sensible, who had left the band in 1984. In 1988, James and Sensible rejoined to play a series of reunion gigs, one of which was released the next year as the live album Final Damnation (1989). Their fast-driven punk rock has been cited for influencing and shaping the emergence of hardcore punk in the late 1970s and early 1980s in the United Kingdom and the United States.

The Damned again reformed for a tour in 1991. In 1995, they released a new studio album, Not of This Earth, which was Scabies's last with the band. This was followed by Grave Disorder (2001), So, Who's Paranoid? (2008), and Evil Spirits (2018) their first studio album in the United Kingdom's Official Charts' top 10 list, landing at No. 7. Despite going through numerous line-up changes, the formation of Vanian, Sensible, keyboardist Monty Oxymoron, drummer Pinch and bassist Stu West had been together from 2004 until 2017, when West left the band and former bassist Paul Gray rejoined. In 2019 drummer Pinch left the band and in February 2022 was replaced by new drummer Will Taylor.

As one of the first gothic rock bands, The Damned, featuring lead singer Vanian's baritone singing, dark lyrics and vampire-themed costume, were a major influence on the goth subculture.

History

Formation and Stiff years (1976–1978)
Dave Vanian (David Lett), Captain Sensible (Raymond Burns) and Rat Scabies (Chris Millar) had been members of the band Masters of the Backside, which also included future Pretenders frontwoman Chrissie Hynde. Brian James (Brian Robertson) had been a member of London SS, who never played live, but in addition to James included musicians who later found fame in the Clash and Generation X. Scabies knew James through a failed audition as drummer for London SS. When the two decided to start their own band, with James on guitar and Scabies on drums, they invited Sid Vicious, later of the Sex Pistols, and Dave Vanian to audition to be the singer. Only Vanian showed up, and got the part. Sensible became the band's bassist, and the four called themselves The Damned. Chrissie Hynde would later write that "Without me, they were probably the most musically accomplished punk outfit in town".

The Damned played their first show on 6 July 1976, supporting the Sex Pistols at the 100 Club. A lo-fi recording of the show was later released as Live at the 100 Club (2007). As part of London's burgeoning punk scene, The Damned again played the club on 20 September, for the 100 Club Punk Festival.

On 22 October, five weeks before the release of the Sex Pistols' "Anarchy in the U.K.", Stiff Records put out the Damned's first single, "New Rose", thus making them the first UK punk band to release a single. The single's B-side was a fast-paced cover of the Beatles' "Help!". "New Rose" was described by critic Ned Raggett as a "deathless anthem of nuclear-strength romantic angst".

When the Sex Pistols released their single, they took The Damned, along with The Clash and Johnny Thunders' Heartbreakers, as openers for their December "Anarchy Tour of the UK". Many of the tour dates were cancelled by organizers or local authorities, with only seven of approximately twenty scheduled shows taking place. The Damned were kicked off the tour before it ended by Sex Pistols manager Malcolm McLaren.

The Damned released their debut studio album, Damned Damned Damned, on 18 February 1977. Produced by Nick Lowe, it was the first studio album released by a British punk band, and included a new single, "Neat Neat Neat". The band went on tour to promote the album, in March opening for T. Rex on their final tour before Marc Bolan's death that September. Later that spring, they became the first British punk band to tour the United States. According to Brendan Mullen, founder of the Los Angeles club The Masque, their first tour of the U.S. found them favouring very fast tempos, helping to inspire the first wave of west coast hardcore punk.

That August, Lu Edmonds was added as a second guitarist. Although not yet obvious in their music, the band were heavily inspired by psychedelic rock. They unsuccessfully tried to recruit the reclusive Syd Barrett to produce their second studio album. Unable to get Barrett, they settled for his former Pink Floyd bandmate, Nick Mason. In November, this album was released as Music for Pleasure (1977), and was quickly dismissed by critics. Its failure led to the band being dropped from Stiff Records. Scabies was also displeased with the album, and quit the band after the recording. He was replaced by future Culture Club drummer Jon Moss, who played with The Damned until they decided to break up in February 1978.

Reformation and Machine Gun Etiquette (1978–1979)
The former members of the band worked on a series of brief side projects and solo recordings, all making little commercial impact. Scabies formed a one-off band called "Les Punks" for a late 1978 gig. Les Punks was a quasi-reunion of the Damned (without Brian James or Edmonds) that featured Scabies, Vanian, Sensible and bassist Lemmy of Hawkwind and Motörhead. The Damned tentatively reformed with the "Les Punks" line-up in early 1979, but originally performed as "The Doomed" to avoid potential trademark problems. Captain Sensible switched to guitar and keyboards, and after a brief period with Lemmy on bass for studio demos and a handful of live appearances, and a slightly longer period with Henry Badowski on bass, the bassist position was filled by Algy Ward, formerly of The Saints. During a December 1978 tour of Scotland, Gary Holton filled in for Vanian.

The band officially went by The Damned again, playing their first gig under that name in April 1979, and signing a recording contract with Chiswick Records. They went back to the studio and released the charting singles, "Love Song" and "Smash It Up", followed by 1979's Machine Gun Etiquette, and then a cover version of Jefferson Airplane's "White Rabbit". Vanian's vocals had by now expanded from the high-baritone of the early records to a smoother crooning style.

Machine Gun Etiquette (1979) featured a strong 1960s garage rock influence, with Farfisa organ on several songs. Recording at London's Wessex Studios at the same time as The Clash were there to record London Calling (1979), Joe Strummer and Mick Jones made an uncredited vocal appearance on the title track. Fans and critics were pleasantly surprised, and Machine Gun Etiquette (1979) received largely positive reviews; Ira Robbins and Jay Pattyn of Trouser Press described it as "a great record by a band many had already counted out".

Shift towards gothic rock (1980–1987)
Ward left the band in 1980, to be replaced by Paul Gray, formerly of Eddie and the Hot Rods. The Black Album was released later that year, produced by the band themselves apart from one track produced by Hans Zimmer, with three sides of the double album consisting of studio tracks, including the theatrical 17-minute song "Curtain Call". Side 4 featured a selection of live tracks recorded at Shepperton Studios. It was their last album for Chiswick.

In 1981, The Damned released Friday 13th, a four-song EP which featured original tracks "Disco Man", "Billy Bad Breaks", "Limit Club", and a cover version of the Rolling Stones song "Citadel".

In 1982, The Damned released their only studio album for Bronze Records, Strawberries. The band had now expanded to a quintet, with the addition of new full-time keyboardist Roman Jugg. At this time, Sensible was splitting his time between The Damned and his own solo career, which had seen success in the UK with the number one hit "Happy Talk" in 1982. Consequently, the band's next album was a one-off side project recorded without the unavailable Sensible: a soundtrack to an imaginary 1960s movie called Give Daddy the Knife, Cindy. This limited-run album of 1960s cover songs had the band billed as Naz Nomad and the Nightmares.

In 1984, the Damned made a live performance on the BBC Two sitcom The Young Ones performing their song "Nasty", featuring new bassist Bryn Merrick (replacing Gray) and both Jugg and Sensible on guitar. Sensible played a last concert with the band at Brockwell Park, before leaving to pursue his solo career.

From the beginnings of the band, Vanian had adopted a vampire-like appearance onstage, with chalk-white makeup and formal dress. With Sensible gone, Vanian's image became more characteristic of the band as a whole. The Damned signed a recording contract with major label MCA Records, and the Phantasmagoria album followed in July 1985, preceded by the UK No. 21 single "Grimly Fiendish". Other hits from the same album were "The Shadow of Love" with its gloomy gothic sound, and the lighter "Is It A Dream?".

In January 1986, the non-album single "Eloise", a cover version of the 1968 hit by Barry Ryan, was a No. 3 chart success in the UK, the band's highest chart placing to date.

However, Phantasmagorias December 1986 follow-up, Anything, was a commercial failure, although MCA did include one of its tracks ("In Dulce Decorum") on the Miami Vice II soundtrack release. The cover of Love's "Alone Again Or" was also released as a single.

Late in 1987, The Damned began to work on a new studio album for MCA, but the result of these sessions remains unreleased as the record contract was dissolved. Two of the new songs ("Gunning for Love" and "The Loveless and the Damned") were later re-recorded by the Dave Vanian and the Phantom Chords side project.

Reunion and farewell tours (1988–89) 
In June 1988, James and Sensible rejoined the group temporarily for three live appearances, including a concert at the London Town and Country Club which was released the following year as the album Final Damnation. 

In June 1989, James and Sensible again rejoined the group for two UK appearances billed as The Final Curtain. In July this line-up performed a farewell tour of the US and in December they performed a further five UK gigs advertised as the We Really Must Be Going Now tour. 

Second and third reformations (1990–1995)
Although officially on hiatus, the band issued two singles in 1990. The first, "Fun Factory", was a song recorded in 1982 by the Sensible/Vanian/Scabies/Gray line-up; intended for single release at the time, the bankruptcy of their record company prevented the issue of the record for 9 years. The year's second single, "Prokofiev", was recorded by Scabies, Vanian and Brian James, and was sold on a 1991 reunion tour of the US.

In 1993 the band reformed again with a new line-up featuring Scabies, Vanian, guitarists Kris Dollimore (formerly of The Godfathers), Alan Lee Shaw, and bassist Moose Harris (formerly of New Model Army). Around this time, two prominent modern rock groups each covered a Damned song: Guns N' Roses recorded "New Rose" for their "The Spaghetti Incident?" (1993), while The Offspring covered "Smash It Up" for the Batman Forever soundtrack (1995). Both cover versions enjoyed major label distribution and created more exposure to The Damned sound, sometimes to a younger audience unfamiliar with the group.

The reformed Damned toured regularly for about two years and released a new studio album, Not of This Earth in November 1995. Promoted with a series of long tours prior to its release, by the time the album was released the Damned had yet again split, partly as the result of legal battles: Vanian and Sensible accused Scabies of releasing Not of This Earth (1995) without proper authorization.

Return of Captain Sensible and new line-up (1996–2003)
Sensible rejoined Vanian in 1996 and yet another formation of the Damned appeared. This initially featured bassist Paul Gray, who was later replaced by Patricia Morrison, previously of Bags, The Gun Club and The Sisters of Mercy.

By February 1999, the Damned consisted of Vanian, Sensible, Morrison and new recruits Monty Oxymoron on keyboards and Spike T. Smith on drums. Spike would later that year go on to join Morrissey's live band and on Spike's recommendation the band recruited Andy (Pinch) Pinching, a founding member of English Dogs, to replace him on drums. Garrie Dreadful, a recruit from Sensible's solo band, played drums from 1997 to 1999 then gave way to Spike. In 2001, the band released the album Grave Disorder, on Dexter Holland's Nitro Records label and promoted it with continual touring. A spring tour of the United States was planned in 2002 supporting Rob Zombie. However, the band dropped off after a few shows with Captain Sensible saying, "gothic punk was completely lost on the predominantly metal crowds". In the summer they played the Vans Warped Tour in the US.

Line-up change, 40th anniversary, and new album (2004–2019)

Morrison and Vanian married and had a daughter, Emily, born on 9 February 2004. Around this time, Morrison 'retired' from performing with the band, though she remained involved with the Damned as the band's manager. Her replacement on bass was Stu West.

In 2006, The Damned released the single "Little Miss Disaster", and a live DVD MGE25 documenting a 2004 Manchester concert celebrating the 25th anniversary of Machine Gun Etiquette (1979). On 21 October 2006, BBC Radio 2 broadcast an hour-long documentary titled Is She Really Going Out with Him? concerning the recording of the Damned's first single "New Rose" and the group's place in the 1976 London punk scene. Featuring interviews with James, Sensible, Scabies, Glen Matlock, Don Letts and Chrissie Hynde, the programme discussed the bands and personalities around the scene, particularly the Anarchy in the U.K. tour.

On 28 October 2008, The Damned released for download their tenth studio album, So, Who's Paranoid?, followed by a physical release on the English Channel label on 10 November (UK) and 9 December (US). To promote the album, the band made back-to-back appearances performing on the CBS network TV broadcasts in the US on Halloween as well as the previous evening on The Late Late Show with Craig Ferguson. The band undertook a 23-date UK tour to promote their new studio album, supported by Devilish Presley and Slicks Kitchen. The band then played a set and conducted a short interview on the Cherry Blossom Clinic on WFMU on 16 May 2009.

In November 2009, the band supported Motörhead on the UK leg of their world tour.

Continual touring occurred throughout the UK and Europe over the next few years. In 2012, they played South America for the first time, with dates in São Paulo (Brazil) and Buenos Aires (Argentina). They returned to the Rhythm Festival, one of only four headline acts to return over the festival's seven-year history. In 2012, The Damned announced that they would return for 2013's Rebellion Festival alongside The Exploited, The Casualties and others.

On 7 November 2014 Sensible and Vanian appeared on Ken Reid's TV Guidance Counselor Podcast.

In 2015, The Damned were featured in a documentary by director Wes Orshoski called The Damned: Don't You Wish That We Were Dead. The documentary charts the history of the band against a backdrop of archival footage, new interviews and tour footage from 2011 to 2014.

After the release of the film, on 12 September 2015, former bassist Bryn Merrick died of throat cancer. Merrick had played on Phantasmagoria (1985) and Anything (1986). At the time of his death he had been playing in a Ramones tribute band, Shamones.

In May 2016 the band played a 40th anniversary show at the Royal Albert Hall.

In the summer of 2017 "Neat Neat Neat" was prominently featured in the action film Baby Driver and its soundtrack. On 11 September 2017, the band announced that Stu West was leaving the band and former bassist Paul Gray would be returning for the new studio album. Evil Spirits, the band's eleventh album and first in ten years, was released on 13 April 2018. It peaked at No. 7 on the UK Albums Chart, their highest ever chart position, topping their previous high of No. 11 in 1985 (Phantasmagoria). The album was recorded in November 2017 in New York City and produced by Tony Visconti who is best known for his work with David Bowie. To get the album made, it was largely crowdfunded through PledgeMusic. The album was preceded by the first single, "Standing on the Edge of Tomorrow" in January 2018 along with the singles "Devil in Disguise" and "Look Left" in March 2018 and "Procrastination" in April 2018.

On 23 May 2019, The Damned started a tour performing their third studio album, Machine Gun Etiquette (1979), which they hadn't played in full since its release. The tour included such venues as the House of Blues, Punk Rock Bowling and Music Festival, and Rebellion Festival.

Departure of Pinch, original line-up reunion and new drummer (2019–present)

On 25 October 2019, Pinch announced that he would be departing the band after 20 years. His last gig was The Damned's show at the London Palladium on 27 October 2019.

On 21 October 2020, The Damned announced that in 2021 the original line up of Dave Vanian, Captain Sensible, Brian James and Rat Scabies would play a series of shows. This would mark the first time in over two decades that James and Scabies have played with Vanian and Sensible. Due to COVID concerns, it was later announced that the tour, while still featuring the same line-up, was postponed until 2022.

In February 2022, Pinch was replaced by drummer Will Taylor.

In February 2023, the band's next studio album was announced with the title Darkadelic, which references their gothic and psychedelic influences. The lead single, "The Invisible Man", was also simultaneously released with its video being produced by Martin Gooch.

Discography

Damned Damned Damned (1977)
Music for Pleasure (1977)
Machine Gun Etiquette (1979)
The Black Album (1980)
Strawberries (1982)
Phantasmagoria (1985)
Anything (1986)
Not of This Earth (1995)
Grave Disorder (2001)
So, Who's Paranoid? (2008)
Evil Spirits (2018)
Darkadelic (2023)

MembersCurrent membersDave Vanian (David Lett) – lead vocals 
Captain Sensible (Raymond Burns) – guitar, backing vocals , keyboards , bass 
Paul Gray – bass, backing vocals 
Monty Oxymoron (Laurence Burrow) – keyboards, backing vocals 
Will Taylor – drums Live members for 2022 reunion tour'
Brian James (Brian Robertson) – guitar, backing vocals 
Rat Scabies (Christopher Millar) – drums, backing vocals

References

External links

 
 Captain Sensible Interview (and video of interview and 35th anniversary tour), Rocker Magazine, 2011.
 
 
 
 
 The Damned article by Chris Hunt, published in Q Magazine, 2003.
 Review of 2006 BBC radio prog "Is she really going out with him?"
 Review of The Damned – The Phoenix, Exeter 19/05/10

English punk rock groups
English gothic rock groups
English post-punk music groups
English new wave musical groups
Musical groups from London
Musical groups established in 1976
Stiff Records artists
I.R.S. Records artists
Bronze Records artists
MCA Records artists
1976 establishments in England
Live Here Now artists
Chiswick Records artists
Nitro Records artists
Cleopatra Records artists